Oceania Cup may refer to:
Oceania Cup (Australian rules football), youth Aussie rules tournament
Men's Oceania Cup, the men's field hockey tournament
Women's Oceania Cup, the women's field hockey tournament
ITTF-Oceania Cup, the table tennis competition
Oceania Sevens, the rugby sevens competition
OFC Nations Cup, the football (soccer) tournament
FORU Oceania Cup, the rugby union competition
1997 Oceania Cup, a rugby league competition
Oceania Cup (rugby league), a rugby league competition
2019 Oceania Cup (field hockey), a hockey competition